A Type & A Shadow is an EP by The Scene Aesthetic.

Track listing
 "Grace Looks Back (Where You Need to Be)" – 2:59
 "Humans" – 4:09
 "Red Rover" – 3:16
 "It's a Promise, Like a Song" – 3:26
 "Come What May" – 3:54
 "The Man I Am" – 3:54

Personnel

Eric Bowley – Vocals
Andrew de Torres – Vocals, Guitar

Brandon Metcalf – Producer, Engineer, Mixer

2009 EPs
The Scene Aesthetic albums